Gawain is, in Arthurian legend, King Arthur's nephew and one of the Knights of the Round Table. 

Gawain may also refer to:

People:
Gawain Westray Bell (1909–1995), British colonial administrator and Governor of Northern Nigeria
Gawain Briars (born 1958), English squash player and lawyer
Gawain Erland Cooper, Orcadian and Scottish folk guitarist and singer
Gawain or Gavin Douglas (c. 1474–1522), Scottish bishop, makar (poet or bard) and translator
Gawain Jones (born 1987), English chess grandmaster
Gawain, a medieval character in Between the Lions

Other uses:
Gawain (opera), first performed in 1991
2054 Gawain, an asteroid

See also
Pearl Poet or the “Gawain Poet”, 14th-century English author